"Tabú" is a song by Spanish singer-songwriter Pablo Alborán and American singer Ava Max. It was released on 6 November 2019.

Background and promotion
On 25 October 2019, Alborán started posting cryptic illustrations of a group called El Clan. According to the captions, all of the figures are connected to flashbacks Alborán's character once experienced and were collectively aimed at a project called "Tabú" which would be out on 6 November. Three days later, Alborán posted the image of a partially masked Ava Max and hinted at a possible collaboration. Both artists confirmed the song "Tabú" a day after that. The singers performed the song live for the first time a few days before release.

Music video
The music video was released on 6 November 2019 and was directed by Santiago Salviche. The release of the video was broadcast live at Callao Square in Madrid. According to Diario Sur, the video is based on classic tragedies like Blood Wedding and Romeo and Juliet but with a futuristic spin, reminiscent of Blade Runner or Mad Max. Thematically, the video deals with a man falling in love just before getting married, therefore breaking a "taboo".

Personnel
Credits adapted from Tidal.

 Pablo Alborán – songwriting, vocals
 Ava Max – vocals
 Edgar Barrera – production, engineering
 Oscar Clavel – engineering
 Bori Alarcón – mastering
 Cirkut – mixing

Charts

Weekly charts

Year-end charts

Certifications

Release history

References

2019 singles
2019 songs
Pablo Alborán songs
Ava Max songs
Songs written by Pablo Alborán
Warner Music Spain singles